Sasha Wortzel is an artist, filmmaker, educator, and activist, based in New York City. She is the writer, director, and producer of Happy Birthday, Marsha! with Tourmaline. She and Tourmaline raised over $25,000 on Kickstarter to fund the film.

Wortzel co-created the documentary We Came to Sweat: The Legend of Starlite. The film concerns the community efforts to stop the eviction of the Starlite Lounge, the oldest black gay bar in Brooklyn. It was a highlight of the 2014 New York Lesbian, Gay, Bisexual, & Transgender Film Festival.

Wortzel's interactive artwork 42 Butter Lane (2011) was included in the 2014 exhibition Roaming House at A.I.R. Gallery. The exhibition, curated by Mira Schor, sought to update the 1972 feminist art installation Womanhouse.

References

External links
Official website

Happy Birthday, Marsha! Directed by Reina Gossett and Sasha Wortzel

Living people
American documentary filmmakers
Year of birth missing (living people)